William Warner Hoppin (September 1, 1807 – April 19, 1890) was the 24th Governor of Rhode Island from 1854 to 1857.

Early life
Hoppin was a native of Providence, Rhode Island.  He graduated from the Hopkins School in 1824 and then went to Yale University and Yale Law School.  He practiced law in Providence.

Political career

He was elected to the Providence City Council in 1838 and served for four years.  He later became active as a Whig, and in 1847 he was elected to Providence's Board of Aldermen, where he served for five years.

In 1853 he was elected to the Rhode Island State Senate, where he served until 1854.

He was elected Governor as a Whig and served three one year terms, 2 May 1854 to 26 May 1857.

Hoppin was a member of the Know Nothing or American Party, an anti-Catholic organization which was very influential in Rhode Island during Hoppin's term of office. Hoppin won the Governorship by heading both the Whig and Know-Nothing tickets.

In 1854, Governor Hoppin helped spread rumor of an armed Catholic conspiracy in Rhode Island. In response to this imagined threat, Hoppin provided uniforms and weapons to form the "Guards of Liberty," a military unit whose members consisted solely of native-born white Protestants.

He became a Republican when the party was founded in the 1850s, and he was a Delegate to the 1856 Republican National Convention, and campaigned for John C. Fremont.

He participated in the Peace Conference of 1861, which attempted to prevent the start of the American Civil War  When the war began he was a staunch supporter of the Union cause, campaigning for Abraham Lincoln in 1860 and 1864, and Ulysses S. Grant in 1868 and 1872.  During the war, Hoppin was active in efforts to raise troops for Rhode Island's regiments and other activities in support of the Union Army.

In 1866 Hoppin was returned to the Rhode Island Senate, and served until 1867.  In 1875, he was elected to one term in the Rhode Island House of Representatives.

Hoppin was appointed a federal Registrar in Bankruptcy in 1867, and served until 1872.

He was a hereditary member of the Rhode Island Society of the Cincinnati and served as its vice president.  He was also a 3rd Class Companion (i.e. honorary member) of the Massachusetts Commandery of the Military Order of the Loyal Legion of the United States in recognition of his support for the Union during the Civil War.

Death and burial
Governor Hoppin died in Providence on April 19, 1890, and was buried in Providence's Swan Point Cemetery.

References

Further reading
Yale Obituaries
Ex-gov- William W. Hoppin Dead, New York Times, April 20, 1890
William Warner Hoppin at National Governors Association
J. H. Beers & Co. (Chicago), Representative Men and Old Families of Rhode Island, Volume 1, 1908, page 87
James T. White & Company (New York), The National Cyclopedia of American Biography, Volume 9, 1899, page 400

1807 births
1890 deaths
Republican Party governors of Rhode Island
Hopkins School alumni
Yale Law School alumni
Rhode Island lawyers
Republican Party members of the Rhode Island House of Representatives
Republican Party Rhode Island state senators
Rhode Island Whigs
Rhode Island Know Nothings
Providence City Council members
People of Rhode Island in the American Civil War
Burials at Swan Point Cemetery
Whig Party state governors of the United States
19th-century American politicians
19th-century American lawyers